Coilodera is a genus of beetles belonging to the family Scarabaeidae, subfamily Cetoniinae.

Species
 Coilodera alexisi Krajcik, 2000 
 Coilodera alveata (Janson, 1884) 
 Coilodera arnaudi Jakl & Krajcik, 2004 
 Coilodera diardi (Gory & Percheron, 1833) 
 Coilodera helleri (Miksic, 1972) 
 Coilodera kalimantanica (Miksic, 1972) 
 Coilodera lecourti Legrand, 2000 
 Coilodera lepesmei Ruter, 1972 
 Coilodera mearesi (Westwood, 1842) 
 Coilodera miksici Antoine, 1986 
 Coilodera montreuili Legrand, 2009 
 Coilodera nobilis (Kraatz, 1894) 
 Coilodera nyassica (Kraatz, 1897) 
 Coilodera penicillata (Hope, 1831) 
 Coilodera praenobilis (Kraatz, 1895) 
 Coilodera pseudoalveata (Miksic, 1971) 
 Coilodera simeuluensis Jakl & Krajcik, 2004 
 Coilodera trisulcata (Gory & Percheron, 1833) 
 Coilodera vitalisi (Bourgoin, 1924)

References
  Biolib

Scarabaeidae genera
Cetoniinae